Alfred Lawson (25 December 1912 – 22 November 1974) was a New Zealand cricketer. He played two first-class matches for Otago in 1944/45.

See also
 List of Otago representative cricketers

References

External links
 

1912 births
1974 deaths
New Zealand cricketers
Otago cricketers
Cricketers from Dunedin